Get Stoked on It! is the debut studio album by American rock band the Wonder Years, released through No Sleep Records on October 30, 2007. The album features guest vocals from Rachel Minton (Zolof the Rock & Roll Destroyer), Bob Wilson (Letxdown), and Brooke Schwartz (CDC). No Sleep released a digital-only reissue of the album on May 15, 2012. The album was remixed, remastered and given a new cover. Commenting on the re-release, lead singer Dan Campbell described the original as a "train wreck", but said since the re-release had been paid for its release was "inevitable". He said about the album, "If you like the record, enjoy the new mixes. If you hate the record, I'm on your side."

Reception

The album was reviewed positively by AbsolutePunk, who awarded it a score of 85%, saying "They blend genres without playing favorites and are poised to win scores of new fans with Get Stoked On It!". Punknews.org was scathing in their 1-star review, saying "It's hard to get stoked about anything on Get Stoked on It!. The only thing I'm stoked on after listening to this album is jumping through a wood-chipper."

Track listing

Personnel

Band
 Dan "Soupy" Campbell — vocals
 Matt Brasch — rhythm guitar, vocals
 Josh Martin — bass, vocals
 Casey Cavaliere — lead guitar, vocals
 Michael Kennedy — drums
 Mikey Kelly - keys, vocals

References

External links

Get Stoked on It! (remixed/remastered) at YouTube (streamed copy where licensed)

2007 albums
The Wonder Years (band) albums
No Sleep Records albums